Kuznetsovskoye is a rural locality (a selo) in Novogeorgiyevsky Selsoviet, Tarumovsky District, Republic of Dagestan, Russia. The population was 486 as of 2010.

Geography 
Kuznetsovskoye is located 22 km south of Tarumovka (the district's administrative centre) by road. Bondarenovskoye and Novogeorgiyevka are the nearest rural localities.

References 

Rural localities in Tarumovsky District